Bait is a 2019 British drama film written and directed by Mark Jenkin. Starring Edward Rowe as a struggling fisherman, the film deals with the tensions that arise between locals and tourists in a Cornish fishing village against a backdrop of second homes, short-term lets, and gentrification.

Plot
Martin Ward is a fisherman in a picturesque Cornish village. He struggles to make ends meet fishing without a boat, while his brother Steven uses their late father's vessel to offer cruise trips to visiting tourists.

Meanwhile, tensions arise between Martin and the out-of-town Leigh family, who use the harbour-front 'Skipper's Cottage' they bought from Martin and Steven as a seasonal holiday home and short-term rental business.

Cast
 Edward Rowe as Martin Ward
 Mary Woodvine as Sandra Leigh
 Simon Shepherd as Tim Leigh
 Georgia Ellery as Katie Leigh
 Giles King as Steven Ward
 Chloe Endean as Wenna Kowalski
 Isaac Woodvine as Neil Ward

Production
Jenkin filmed Bait using a vintage hand-cranked Bolex camera, using 16mm monochrome film that he hand processed. Shooting locations include Gooninnis House in St Agnes, Charlestown and West Penwith, in Cornwall.

Reception 
The site's critical consensus reads, "As visually distinctive as it is narratively satisfying, Bait blends a classic aesthetic with timely themes to produce a thrillingly original and uniquely enriching drama." On Metacritic, the film has a weighted average score of 84 out of 100, based on 8 critics, indicating "universal acclaim".

Writing in The Observer, Mark Kermode gave a glowing review, describing the film as 'a genuine modern masterpiece, which establishes Jenkin as one of the most arresting and intriguing British film-makers of his generation.' He later named Bait his favourite film of both the year and the decade. Peter Bradshaw in The Guardian called the film 'intriguing and unexpectedly watchable', in a four-star review that remarked on the experimental nature of the film.

Accolades

References

External links

 
 
 
 

2019 films
British drama films
2019 drama films
Films set in Cornwall
Films shot in Cornwall
Works about gentrification
Films shot in 16 mm film
2010s English-language films
2010s British films